Manoor is a Mandal in Medak district of Telangana, India. 502286

The villages in Manoor mandal includes: Athimail, Audathpur, Mukhtapur,	Badalgaon, Bellapur, Borancha, Damargidda, Danvar, Davvur, Dudhagonda, Eanakpally, Erakpalle, Gondegam, Gudur, Karsgutti 	Kharamungi, Maikode, Manoor, Morgi, Mavinelly, Nadi Gadda Hukrana Nagalagidda, Pulkurthy, Raipalle, Shari Damargidda, Shelgera, Shikhar Khana, Thimmapur, Thornal, Tumnur, Valloor, Yelgoi and Yesgi. 

This is one of the most backward tehsils in the district. Road connectivity within the tehsil and with other parts of the district is very poor. Poor literacy levels were recorded in the census of 2011 and 2014.

References 

Medak district